Ding Yixin (born April 26, 1991) is a Chinese chess player.

She earned the Woman Grandmaster title in 2010.

She played in the Women's World Chess Championship 2010, but went out in the first round.
 
She played no. 5 (reserve) in the Chinese women's chess team, which won the silver medal at the 40th Chess Olympiad in Istanbul in 2012.

She won the Women's Chinese Chess Championship in 2013, and the Women's Chinese Rapid Championship in 2019.

References

External links 

Chess Olympiad results
report includes photo of her

1991 births
Chinese female chess players
Chess woman grandmasters
Living people
Chess players from Zhejiang
Sportspeople from Shaoxing
21st-century Chinese women